Ermelinda may refer to: 

Ermelinda, opera by Domenico Freschi
:it:Ermelinda (regina)
Ermelinda Meksi an Albanian politician
Ermelinda Zamba (1981) a Mozambican former swimmer
Ermelinda DeLaViña American mathematician